Slovakia has participated in all Summer and Winter Universiades since the dissolution of Czechoslovakia in 1993.

Medal count

Medals at the Summer Universiade

Medals at the Winter Universiade

Medals by summer sport

Medals by winter sport

List of medalists

Summer Universiade

Winter Universiade

Most successful Slovak competitors

See also 
Slovakia at the Olympics
Slovakia at the Paralympics
Slovakia at the European Games
Slovakia at the Youth Olympics
Slovakia at the European Youth Olympic Festival
Slovakia at the World Games

References

External links 
 FISU History at the FISU

 
Nations at the Universiade
Sport in Slovakia